Blackfoot was a mining camp located on a flat area on the north side of a bend in the Similkameen River,  established in the Similkameen Gold Rush of the 1850s. The camp was founded by white miners and was later taken over by Chinese miners after the other miners moved on to richer diggings.

References

Similkameen Country